Asomatianos Tzamplakon was a Byzantine aristocrat and admiral during the Byzantine–Genoese War of 1348–1349.

The Tzamplakones were an important and wealthy aristocratic family attested since the mid-13th century, when one of its members achieved the high military rank of Domestic of the Schools. Alexios Tzamplakon, Asomatianos' father, was this man's son. His brothers, Demetrios and Arsenios, also achieved high offices during the same period. 

Asomatianos is first attested in 1348, as megas doux (commander-in-chief of the Byzantine navy). He was placed in charge of the Byzantine effort to construct a new fleet to use against the Genoese colony of Galata in the Byzantine–Genoese War of 1348–1349. His fleet's inexperience and incompetence led to its destruction or capture by the Genoese. Tzamplakon survived the debacle, and died sometime before 1356.

References

Sources
 
 
 

1350s deaths
14th-century Byzantine people
Megaloi doukes
Asomatianos
Year of birth unknown